The 1918 New York Yankees season was the 15th season for the franchise. The team finished with a record of 60–63, finishing 13.5 games behind the American League champion Boston Red Sox. New York was managed by Miller Huggins. Their home games were played at the Polo Grounds.

Regular season

Season standings

Record vs. opponents

Roster

Player stats

Batting

Starters by position 
Note: Pos = Position; G = Games played; AB = At bats; H = Hits; Avg. = Batting average; HR = Home runs; RBI = Runs batted in

Other batters 
Note: G = Games played; AB = At bats; H = Hits; Avg. = Batting average; HR = Home runs; RBI = Runs batted in

Pitching

Starting pitchers 
Note: G = Games pitched; IP = Innings pitched; W = Wins; L = Losses; ERA = Earned run average; SO = Strikeouts

Other pitchers 
Note: G = Games pitched; IP = Innings pitched; W = Wins; L = Losses; ERA = Earned run average; SO = Strikeouts

Relief pitchers 
Note: G = Games pitched; W = Wins; L = Losses; SV = Saves; ERA = Earned run average; SO = Strikeouts

External links
1918 New York Yankees team page at www.baseball-almanac.com
1918 New York Yankees at Baseball Reference

New York Yankees seasons
New York Yankees
New York Yankees
1910s in Manhattan
Washington Heights, Manhattan